Maine School Administrative District 15 is a public school district that operates three elementary schools (K–2 and 3–4), one middle school (5–8) and one high school (9–12) in Cumberland County in the U.S. state of Maine. The school system serves the towns of Gray, Maine and New Gloucester, Maine. The school system is run by a school board and superintendent system. The school system was established in 1960, and the high school opened in 1962.

Schools

See also 
 New Gloucester, Maine
 Gray, Maine

References

External links 
 Maine School Administrative District 15 Website
 Gray-New Gloucester High School Website

Education in Cumberland County, Maine
15
Gray, Maine
New Gloucester, Maine